Presidential elections were held in Ivory Coast on 27 October 1985. At the time the country was a one-party state with the Democratic Party of Ivory Coast – African Democratic Rally as the sole legal party. Its leader, long-term President Félix Houphouët-Boigny was the only candidate, and was re-elected unopposed.

Results

References

Ivory Coast
1985 in Ivory Coast
Presidential elections in Ivory Coast
One-party elections
Single-candidate elections
Election and referendum articles with incomplete results